Taimo Toomast (born May 17, 1962 in Pärnu) is an Estonian opera singer. He has performed in many European opera houses and has toured in the United States.

Education
Taimo Toomast graduated from the Tallinn Conservatoire in 1989 in the singing class of Teo Maiste. He has complimented his studies in the summer courses of Savonlinna (1987) and Kangasniemi (1988), at the Vienna State Opera studio (1990–1991), the Konservatorium der Stadt Wien (class of Margarethe Bence and Lied-class of David Lutz 1990–1992) and later in Germany by Athe Pars and Georg Fortune. Toomast was able to be the lead in productions such as Das Donaugeschenk by Reiner Bischof, and Mozart's Così fan tutte by the Vienna Chamber Opera.

Career
He has performed as a soloist at the Vienna State Opera and at the Vienna Chamber Opera, he has been soloist at the Coburg Landestheater and in Dessau Anhaltisches Theater (altogether for 12 years). He has performed as guest soloist in many other German theatres (Gera, Bauzen, Osnabrück, Passau). In 2004-2008 he lived and worked in Spain. He has worked together with the Alicante Symphony Orchestra and participated in a concert tour in the USA. Since 2009 Taimo Toomast is lecturer of the singing department at the Estonian Academy of Music and Theatre. From 2009 he is a lector in a song department in Estonian Academy of Music and Theatre. From 2010 Taimo Toomast is once again a guest soloist in Estonian National Opera and in the Vanemuine Theatre.

Toomast's roles have been Figaro in The Barber of Seville, Di Posa in Don Carlos, Sharpless in Madama Butterfly, Papageno in The Magic Flute and Valentin in Faust.

Personal life
Taimo Toomast has three children (Elisabeth, Sophie-Marie and Tristan-Tobias) and is married to Estonian politician Vilja Toomast.

Sources
Pärnu Postimees, "Ooperilaulja Taimo Toomast ei suudaks laulmata elada", 10 August 2007 
Kroonika, "Vilja Savisaar ja Taimo Toomast õrnutsesid laulupeol", 15 July 2009 
Kroonika, Taimo Toomast: "Oleme Viljaga väga õnnelikud!", 5 February 2010 
The Herald (Rock Hill, South Carolina), "Estonian opera singer ready to bring his talents to Woodland UMC", 12 December 2004

1962 births
Living people
20th-century Estonian male opera singers
People from Pärnu
21st-century Estonian male opera singers